The XXXXVIII Grand Prix de France Henri Deglane 2022 (also known as Grand Prix of France 2022 and Henri Deglane Grand Prix 2022) will be a wrestling event held in Nice, France. It was originally scheduled to be held between 20 and 23 January 2022. It is held in the memory of 1924 Olympic Gold medalist Henri Deglane.

French Wrestling Federation (Fédération de Française de Lutte) informed that the Grand Prix de France Henri Deglane 2022 is officially postponed. The decision has been taken after several meetings within the French Wrestling Federation and with the French Ministry of Sports. Given the current COVID-19 situation in France and the world, the French Wrestling Federation recognizes that they cannot organize the competition without putting at risk the athletes and staff.

Medal overview

Men's freestyle

Greco-Roman

Women's freestyle

References

External links 
 Database

2022 in sport wrestling
2022 in French sport
International wrestling competitions hosted by France
Sport in France
Sport in Nice
January 2022 sports events in France